Sortelung is a small village on the Danish island of Funen. It is located near Nørre Lyndelse and south of the city of Odense.

Notable people  

 Carl Nielsen  (1865 in Sortelung – 1931) a Danish composer, conductor and violinist.  He described his childhood in his autobiography Min Fynske Barndom (My Childhood on Funen), published in 1927.

References
 

Villages in Denmark
Faaborg-Midtfyn Municipality